Monoxenus nigrofasciaticollis is a species of beetle in the family Cerambycidae. It was described by Stephan von Breuning in 1967. It is known from Kenya. It feeds on Juniperus procera.

References

nigrofasciaticollis
Beetles described in 1967